The Netherland Tait House is a historic loghouse near Napier, Tennessee. It was built in 1850 on the former McLish Indian Reservation for Netherland Tate, a landowner who owned slaves. It remained in the Tate family until his granddaughter, Nancy Browning, sold it in 1928. It has been listed on the National Register of Historic Places since August 9, 1984.

References

National Register of Historic Places in Lewis County, Tennessee
Houses completed in 1850